Edson Roberto Vieira (born 9 October 1965) is a Brazilian professional football coach and former player who played as a midfielder. He is the current assistant coach of Londrina.

Vieira was nicknamed Maradoninha during his playing days by João Saldanha, as an allusion to Diego Maradona. He was also the first player to score a goal at the Estadio Palogrande in 1994.

Honours

Player
Millonarios
Copa Colombia: 1995

Ceará
Campeonato Cearense: 1996

Rio Preto
Campeonato Paulista Série A3: 1999

Manager
Nacional-PR
Campeonato Paranaense Série Prata: 2003

São Bento
Campeonato Paulista Série A3: 2013

Taubaté
Campeonato Paulista Série A3: 2015

References

External links
 

1965 births
Living people
Sportspeople from Paraná (state)
Brazilian footballers
Association football midfielders
Londrina Esporte Clube players
Botafogo de Futebol e Regatas players
Mogi Mirim Esporte Clube players
Associação Atlética Ponte Preta players
Comercial Futebol Clube (Ribeirão Preto) players
Botafogo Futebol Clube (SP) players
Fortaleza Esporte Clube players
Santa Cruz Futebol Clube players
Esporte Clube Noroeste players
Ceará Sporting Club players
Associação Portuguesa Londrinense players
Rio Preto Esporte Clube players
Leones Negros UdeG footballers
Atlas F.C. footballers
Unión Magdalena footballers
Once Caldas footballers
Millonarios F.C. players
Edessaikos F.C. players
Brazilian expatriate footballers
Brazilian expatriate sportspeople in Mexico
Brazilian expatriate sportspeople in Colombia
Brazilian expatriate sportspeople in Greece
Expatriate footballers in Mexico
Expatriate footballers in Colombia
Expatriate footballers in Greece
Brazilian football managers
Comercial Futebol Clube (Ribeirão Preto) managers
Clube Atlético Sorocaba managers
Londrina Esporte Clube managers
União São João Esporte Clube managers
São Carlos Futebol Clube managers
União Agrícola Barbarense Futebol Clube managers
Esporte Clube XV de Novembro (Piracicaba) managers
Sociedade Esportiva do Gama managers
Sertãozinho Futebol Clube managers
Esporte Clube Taubaté managers
Esporte Clube São Bento managers
Sociedade Esportiva Matonense managers
Rio Branco Esporte Clube managers
Rio Claro Futebol Clube managers
São José Esporte Clube managers
América Futebol Clube (RN) managers